Jedlik Ányos Secondary Grammar School is a high school in Csepel, Budapest, Hungary.

History

The high school was founded in the summer of 1946 at the request of local parents. It was first run by the Order of Saint Benedict from Pannonhalma, but they left the institution in the same year. This school was the first co-education religious school in the country, which got foundation from the state as well. The school's current building is from 1952 when it was a modern one. The most famous teacher of the school was Miklós Vermes.

External links
 Official website (Hungarian)
  Official Website's 'about our school' section.

Gymnasiums in Hungary